Conasprella carvalhoi is a species of sea snail, a marine gastropod mollusc in the family Conidae, the cone snails, cone shells or cones.

Distribution
This marine species occurs in the Caribbean Sea off Nicaragua.

References

 Petuch E.J. & Berschauer D.P. (2017). New species of Pleurotomariidae, Volutidae, and Conidae from the Caribbean Sea and Namibia, Southwestern Africa. The Festivus. 49(4): 317-327

carvalhoi
Gastropods described in 2017